Clara Isabel Grima Ruiz (born 1971) is a professor of applied mathematics at the University of Seville, specializing in computational geometry. She is known for her research on scutoids (polyhedron-like shapes that can pack the space between pairs of curved surfaces) and for her popularization of mathematics.

Education and career
Grima was born in 1971 in Coria del Río. She completed her doctorate in mathematics from the University of Seville in 1998, and is a professor of applied mathematics at the same university.

Grima also serves as president for the committee on popularization of the Royal Spanish Mathematical Society.

Books
Grima's books include:
Computational Geometry on Surfaces: Performing Computational Geometry on the Cylinder, the Sphere, the Torus, and the Cone (with Alberto Márquez, Kluwer, 2001)
Las matemáticas vigilan tu salud: Modelos sobre epidemias y vacunas (Mathematics watches your health, with Enrique F. Borja, Next Door Publishers, 2017), on the applications of mathematics in epidemiology and personal health
¡Que las matemáticas te acompañen! (May mathematics be with you, Ariel, 2018) on the importance of mathematics in understanding the world

References

External links
Home page
Mati y sus mateaventuras, blog by Grima with Raquel Gu

1971 births
Living people
21st-century Spanish mathematicians
Women mathematicians
Researchers in geometric algorithms
Mathematics popularizers
University of Seville alumni
Academic staff of the University of Seville